Ben Ridge (born 13 December 1989) is an Australian former professional rugby league footballer.

Background
Born in Toowoomba, Queensland, Ridge moved to Roma, Queensland at a young age and played his junior rugby league for the Mitchell Magpies. He was then signed by the Gold Coast Titans.

Playing career

Early career
In late 2007, Ridge played for the Australian Schoolboys. In 2008 and 2009, he played for the Gold Coast Titans' NYC team, before moving on to the Titans' Queensland Cup team, Tweed Heads Seagulls in 2010.

2010
In Round 20 of the 2010 NRL season, Ridge made his NRL debut for the Titans against the St. George Illawarra Dragons. He made 4 appearances in total for the season, all victories for the Titans.

2012
On 11 July, Ridge extended his contract with the Titans from the end of 2013 to the end of 2015.

2015
On 19 August, Ridge announced his retirement from rugby league effective immediately, after a long stint of injuries that kept him out of the game.

References

External links
2015 Gold Coast Titans profile

1989 births
Living people
Australian rugby league players
Gold Coast Titans players
Tweed Heads Seagulls players
Rugby league second-rows
Rugby league locks
Rugby league players from Toowoomba